Peter Oliver may refer to:

Peter Oliver, Baron Oliver of Aylmerton (1921–2007), British judge
Peter Oliver (footballer) (born 1948), Scottish footballer
Peter Oliver (loyalist) (1713–1791), justice in the Colony of Massachusetts and loyalist during the American Revolution
Peter Oliver (painter) (1594–1648), English miniaturist
Peter Oliver (theatre director) (1926–2007), British actor and theatre director
Peter Oliver, former member of pop group The New Seekers

See also
Peter Oliva, Canadian novelist